Arthur is an unincorporated community on Lunice Creek in Grant County, West Virginia, United States. It lies along County Route 5 north of Petersburg.

References

Unincorporated communities in Grant County, West Virginia
Unincorporated communities in West Virginia